Ondrej Debnár  (born 18 June 1973 in Zvolen) is a Slovak professional footballer who currently plays for MFK Lokomotíva Zvolen. He was a captain of FK Dukla.

Club career
Debnár spent one season in the Turkish Super Lig with Elazığspor.

International career
Debnár has made four appearances for the full Slovakia national football team.

References

External links
 

1973 births
Living people
Sportspeople from Zvolen
Slovak footballers
Slovakia international footballers
Association football defenders
FC Petržalka players
MFK Ružomberok players
FK Dukla Banská Bystrica players
Slovak expatriate footballers
Elazığspor footballers
Slovak Super Liga players
Süper Lig players
Expatriate footballers in Turkey
Expatriate footballers in Hungary
FC Sopron players
Slovak expatriate sportspeople in Hungary
Slovak expatriate sportspeople in Turkey